The 2019–20 Biathlon World Cup (BWC) was a multi-race series over a season of biathlon, organised by the International Biathlon Union. The season started on 30 November 2019 in Östersund, Sweden and ended on 14 March 2020 in Kontiolahti, Finland, a week and a day earlier than planned.

Calendar 
Below was the IBU World Cup calendar for the 2019–20 season.

World Cup podiums

Men

Women

Men's team

Women's team

Mixed

Standings (men)

Overall 

 Final standings after 21 races.

Individual 

Final standings after 3 races.

Sprint 

Final standings after 8 races.

Pursuit 

Final standings after 5 races.

Mass start 

Final standings after 5 races.

Relay 

Final standings after 6 races.

Nation 

Final standings after 23 races.

Standings (women)

Overall 

 Final standings after 21 races.

Individual 

Final standings after 3 races.

Sprint 

Final standings after 8 races.

Pursuit 

Final standings after 5 races.

Mass start 

Final standings after 5 races.

Relay 

Final standings after 6 races.

Nation 

Final standings after 23 races.

Standings: Mixed

Mixed relay 

 Final standings after 6 races.

Medal table

Points distribution 
The table shows the number of points won in the 2019/20 Biathlon World Cup for men and women. Relay events do not impact individual rankings.

Achievements 

 First World Cup career victory

Men
 , 24, in his 3rd season — World Championships Pursuit in Antholz-Anterselva; first podium was 2019–20 Pursuit in Hochfilzen

Women
 , 23, in her 4th season — Stage 8 Pursuit in Kontiolahti; first podium was 2019–20 Individual in Östersund

 First World Cup podium

Men
 , 26, in his 6th season — no. 3 in the Stage 1 Sprint in Östersund
 , 24, in his 3rd season — no. 3 in the Stage 2 Pursuit in Hochfilzen
 , 25, in his 3rd season — no. 3 in the Stage 6 Individual in Pokljuka

Women
 , 23, in her 4th season — no. 3 in the Stage 1 Individual in Östersund
 , 25, in her 4th season — no. 3 in the Stage 2 Sprint in Hochfilzen
 , 24, in her 6th season — no. 3 in the Stage 3 Pursuit in Le Grand-Bornand
 , 25, in her 5th season — no. 3 in the Stage 3 Mass Start in Le Grand-Bornand
 , 27, in her 7th season — no. 3 in the  World Championships Sprint in Antholz-Anterselva

Team

Men
-
Mixed
  - no. 2 in Stage 6 Single Mixed Relay in Pokljuka

Women
  — no. 2 in Stage 1 Women's Relay in Östersund

 Victory in this World Cup (all-time number of victories in parentheses)

Men
 , 10 (47) first places
 , 7 (79) first places
 , 1 (3) first place
 , 1 (2) first place
 , 1 (2) first place
 , 1 (1) first place

Women
 , 7 (13) first places
 , 4 (11) first places
 , 3 (7) first places
 , 3 (6) first places
 , 1 (27) first place
 , 1 (3) first place
 , 1 (2) first place
 , 1 (1) first place

Retirements 
The following notable biathletes retired during or after the 2019–20 season:

Men
 
 
 
 
 
 
 
 
 
 
 
 

Women

References

External links 

 IBU official site

 
Biathlon World Cup
2019 in biathlon
2020 in biathlon
Biathlon